The R666 road is a regional road in Ireland which runs west-east from the R639 in Fermoy town centre to the bridge over the River Blackwater on the outskirts of Lismore. The road passes through Ballyduff, and beneath the River Blackwater viaduct which carries the M8 motorway. The R666 begins in Fermoy as the Rathhealy Road. From here to its merger with the R667 road 3km south of Kilworth, the R666 was once part of the historic road linking Dublin and Cork. It was mapped as such by Herman Moll in his 1714 New Map of Ireland.

Locally, the road is sometimes humorously known as the road to hell from its name being the same as the Number of the Beast.

See also
Roads in Ireland
Motorways in Ireland
National primary road
National secondary road
History of roads in Ireland

References

Roads Act 1993 (Classification of Regional Roads) Order 2006 – Department of Transport

Regional roads in the Republic of Ireland
Roads in County Waterford
Roads in County Cork